Robert Hunt Stapylton Dudley Lydston Newman, 1st Baron Mamhead (27 October 1871 – 2 November 1945), known as Sir Robert Newman, Bt, between 1892 and 1931, was a British politician. He was also a president of the Church of England Society for the Maintenance of the Faith.

Background
Newman was the son of Sir Lydston Newman, 3rd Baronet. He succeeded his father in the baronetcy in December 1892, aged 23.

Political career
Newman was Member of Parliament for Exeter between 1918 and 1931. He sat as a Conservative from 1918 to 1927 and as an independent from 1927 to 1931. He was also a Deputy Lieutenant and Justice of the Peace for Devon and a member of the Devon County Council. In the 1931 Dissolution Honours he was raised to the peerage as Baron Mamhead, of Exeter in the County of Devon.

Personal life
Lord Mamhead never married. He died in November 1945, aged 74, when the barony became extinct. The baronetcy was passed on to a cousin.

References

External links 
 

1871 births
1945 deaths
Barons in the Peerage of the United Kingdom
Newman, Robert
Newman, Robert
Newman, Robert
Newman, Robert
Newman, Robert
Newman, Robert
Newman, Robert
UK MPs who were granted peerages
Members of Devon County Council
Deputy Lieutenants of Devon
Members of the Parliament of the United Kingdom for Exeter
Barons created by George V